Ernie Mendillo (born October 23, 1959) is an American musician who co-founded the New York band The Brandos with Dave Kincaid in 1985. He left the band in 2015. Besides playing with The Brandos, Mendillo was also a member of the Sarajevo rock band Bombaj Štampa. He is currently a member of HELP! A Beatles Tribute, performing concerts throughout Europe.

As a musician he has worked with Dion DiMucci, Scott Kempner, Dennis Diken, Simon Kirke, Branko Đurić and Pero Lovšin.

External links
[  The Brandos] at Allmusic

Living people
American rock bass guitarists
American male bass guitarists
1959 births
The Brandos members